Protein transport protein Sec16A is a protein that in humans is encoded by the SEC16A gene.

References

Further reading